Stiven Mikhail  Born July 1st 1984 is a Canadian football coach working for Aqvital FC Csákvár(Hungary). He began his career in Ontario, Canada working for Richmond Hill Raiders where he went on to be head coach of Pro stars FC (League1 Ontario). He now coaches the youth team of Aqvital FC Csákvár U19 since December 2021. 

He obtained his UEFA license in Germany October 2021 and also earned coaching licenses from the CSA (Canadian soccer association).

Current club 
Stiven moved to Hungary in December 2021 after receiving an offer for Aqvital FC Csákvár. At the time of his arrival in Csákvár the team had 120 players in the academy. After appointing Stiven as the manager of the youth team, the club grew to 450 players in 8 months.

Early career

2016 -2021 
Stiven started his career with Prostars FC. 

(League1Ontario)

2019- 2021 
He took on the role of Head  coach for ProStars FC League1Ontario.

References 

Year of birth missing (living people)
Living people
Canadian soccer coaches